Erwin Koln (Korda) (not to be confused with Erwin Kohn), was a male Czech international table tennis player.

Table tennis career
He won a bronze medal at the 1934 World Table Tennis Championships in the men's doubles with Miloslav Hamr. He also won two silver medals in the Swaythling Cup (men's team events) in 1933 and 1934.

He was from Eastern Slovakia.

See also
 World Table Tennis Championships
 List of table tennis players
 List of World Table Tennis Championships medalists

References

Czechoslovak table tennis players
World Table Tennis Championships medalists